Jim McDonnell (born 12 September 1960) is a British former boxer who won the European featherweight title and twice fought for World titles at super featherweight.

Career

Amateur
He represented England and won a silver medal in the lightweight division, at the 1982 Commonwealth Games in Brisbane, Queensland, Australia. He won the 1982 Amateur Boxing Association British lightweight title, when boxing out of the St. Pancras ABC.

Professional
Born in London and a caretaker working for Camden Council outside of boxing, McDonnell made his professional debut in March 1983 with a points win over Phil Duke. In March 1985 he beat Clyde Ruan to take the BBBofC Southern Area featherweight title, a fight that was also a British title eliminator.

The British title fight didn't materialise but in November 1985 he faced Jose Luis Vicho for the vacant European featherweight title; McDonnell stopped the Spaniard in the fourth round to become European champion. He successfully defended the European title in July 1986 against Salvatore Bottiglieri, taking a points decision.

By 1988 he had moved up to super featherweight and still with a 100% record from 24 fights fought South African Brian Mitchell for the latter's WBA super featherweight title in November. The fight went the full twelve rounds but Mitchell won via a comfortable unanimous decision, the first defeat of McDonnell's career.

McDonnell returned in March 1989 with a points win over Benjie Marquez, and in May of that year faced Barry McGuigan at the G-Mex Centre, Manchester. Although the underdog, McDonnell dominated the fight and won after it was stopped in the fourth round due to a cut over McGuigan's right eye. The defeat effectively ended McGuigan's career.

In November 1989 McDonnell got a second shot at a World title when he challenged for Azumah Nelson's WBC super featherweight title at the Royal Albert Hall. Nelson had McDonnell down four times and stopped him in the twelfth and final round.

He returned in September 1990 when he was stopped by future WBF World champion Kenny Vice in the fourth round. After more than seven years out of the ring, and at the age of 38, he returned in February 1998 against Peter Feher, losing a six-round points decision.

Personal life
After retiring from boxing he worked as a painter and decorator, ran a gym in Camden, and became a trainer, most notably working with Danny Williams and James DeGale. He also ran the London Marathon several times, his best time 2 hours 49 minutes.

References

External links

1960 births
Living people
Featherweight boxers
Super-featherweight boxers
Boxers from Greater London
English male boxers
Boxers at the 1982 Commonwealth Games
Commonwealth Games silver medallists for England
Commonwealth Games medallists in boxing
Medallists at the 1982 Commonwealth Games